Macy's Central, headquartered in Atlanta, Georgia, is a division of Macy's, Inc.  It has stores in Alabama, Georgia, Kentucky, Louisiana, North Carolina, Ohio, Oklahoma, South Carolina, Tennessee, Texas (except for the El Paso area stores, which are part of Macy's West), and Virginia (except for Northern Virginia stores, which are part of Macy's East).  The divisional flagship store is located at Lenox Square in Atlanta.

The new division was created February 1, 2006 when the then-Federated Department Stores merged the former Macy's Central division with the Macy's stores in Louisiana, the Hecht's stores in most of Virginia and all of North Carolina (roughly much of the former Thalhimers territory) and most of the Foley's stores in Louisiana, Oklahoma, and Texas.  An additional realignment of store operations with Macy's Midwest and Macy's West occurred July 30, 2006, with a further transfer of stores with Macy's Midwest being completed in 2007

On September 9, 2006, the Hecht's and Foley's nameplates was phased out in favor of the nationally known Macy's.  In February 2008 Macy's South acquired Macy's Midwest and renamed itself as Macy's Central.

History
There was a prior division of R.H. Macy & Co., Inc. named Macy's South that was headquartered in Atlanta from 1988 to 1992.  It operated stores in Alabama, Georgia, South Carolina, Florida, Louisiana and Texas as Macy's and in California, Arizona and Nevada as Bullock's.  The former South division was formed following Macy's acquisition of Bullock's, incorporating Macy's Atlanta (the former Davison's stores renamed in 1985) with the Florida, Louisiana and Texas locations of Macy's New York and Bullock's.  It was dissolved in 1992 and its stores consolidated into Macy's East and Macy's West.

The present Macy's Central incorporates all or part of several historic department store franchises, including Rich's, Davison's, Lazarus, Shillito's (John Shillito Co., Cincinnati, Ohio), Rike's, Block's, Foley's, Sanger-Harris, Castner Knott, Goldsmith's, Thalhimer's, Miller & Rhoads, Hecht's, William H. Block Co., Joseph Horne Co., The Famous-Barr Co., L. S. Ayres, The Jones Store Co., Kaufmann's, May Company Ohio, O'Neils and Strouss.

Macy's